Denis Shaw (7 February 1921 – 28 February 1971) was a British character actor specialising in slimy villains. Born in Dulwich as Douglas Findlay Shaw, he was a rotund man, with dark, wavy hair and slanty eyes. This appearance meant he would often be found troubling countless heroes of the 1950s and 1960s on film and television, most memorably as the German guard Priem in The Colditz Story (1955).

Alternatively, he could also be found propping up the tavern bar in a number of British horror films. These include Jack the Ripper (1959), The Mummy (1959) and The Curse of the Werewolf (1961). He was cast in the leading role of The Great Van Robbery (1959) as the judo-throwing Interpol detective Caesar Smith. In the film he travels to Rio de Janeiro, Rome, and Paris, tracking the robbers of a Royal Mint van.

Shaw's many television credits include, The Adventures of Robin Hood, The Avengers, Danger Man, Dixon of Dock Green, The Prisoner, Sherlock Holmes and Z-Cars.

He died in London of a heart attack at the age of 50. A familiar face around the bars of Soho in London, he is mentioned in Keith Waterhouse's play Jeffrey Bernard Is Unwell.

Filmography

External links

English male film actors
English male television actors
1921 births
1971 deaths
People from Dulwich
20th-century English male actors